Douglas Wijkander (6 October 1918 – 20 January 1984) was a Swedish equestrian. He competed in two events at the 1956 Summer Olympics.

References

1918 births
1984 deaths
Swedish male equestrians
Olympic equestrians of Sweden
Equestrians at the 1956 Summer Olympics
Sportspeople from Stockholm